Nanua Bairagi, (~17th–18th century) also known as Nanua Bhagat and Jamala Singh,  was a renowned mystic, humanitarian and Sikh warrior of Punjab.

Nanua as a humanitarian and spiritual mentor of Bhai Kanhaiya
Nanua was also the spiritual mentor of Bhai Kanhaiya, who in turn started "Seva Panthi" mission .

Nanua as a poet-mystic
As a Darbari Kavi, or court poet, of Sikh gurus,  his poetry left an imprint on the poetry style of Bulhe Shah. One of his famous hymns is given as follows:

I am Naught, O Lord, Thou art All! 
I have seen all cloth, each shred,
To find all textures the self-same cotton.
Rama's light of love falls over all:
Fear not then dreadful Kala.
Rama runs through every nerve,
And Sohang, Sohang cry the pores!
I am naught, O Lord, Thou art All!

Sohang is apabransha of Upnishadic Soham (Sanskrit) which means "I am He". This is also termed as mahavakya in Upnishads and represents final union or gnosis of soul with Brahman, or the over-soul.

It is thus clear that Nanua's poetry synthesized both Vedantic and Sufi monisms into distinctly Sikh devotional practice, informed by direct discipleship and service of Sikh masters.  Which speaks volumes about his stature as a poet and his place among the preeminent Sikh mystics whose place in Sikhism is second only to ten Sikh Gurus.

Nanua as a close associate of Sikh gurus
Bhagat Nanua was a reputed Saini of the 17th century and Guru Tegh Bahadur is said to have had a great regard for him.  Throughout his life he rendered his valuable services to Sikh Guru. He enjoyed the privilege of having close relationships with 8th, 9th & 10th Sikh Gurus. At the time of 8th Guru's death in Delhi, he arranged the cremation & later carried Guru ji's bone urn to Kiratpur Sahib.  From there, along with Guru's family members he reached Baba Bakala as indicated by the 8th guru. After the cremation ceremony of 9th guru, he remained in the company of his master on various teaching missions. At the time of the last voyage of Guru Tegh Bahadur ji to Delhi, he accompanied the convoy. After the martyrdom of the Guru & Sikhs, he arranged their cremation. He along with Bhai Jaita and Bhai Uda had found and carried Guru Tegh Bahadur's severed head to Anandpur Sahib.

Nanua as a baptized Sikh, warrior and martyr
As a baptised Sikh of 10th Guru, Guru Gobind Singh, he was named Jamala Singh Nanuan. As a great warrior, his service was equal to his contemporaries, Bhai Bachittar Singh Minhas, Bhai Jaita and Bhai Sangat Singh Minhas, Mai Bhago.

He sacrificed his life in the Battle of Chamkaur Sahib. His son, Darbar Singh laid down his life in the battle of Agampur and another son Gharbara Singh was killed in the battle of Muktsar. His great grandson Kavi Jai Singh Saini had the privilege of being 'Darbari Kavi' at the court of Maharaja Karam Singh of Patiala.

References

Punjabi-language poets
History of Sikhism
Sikh warriors
Year of birth missing
Year of death missing